A tame animal is an animal that is relatively tolerant of human presence. Tameness may arise naturally (as in the case, for example, of island tameness) or due to the deliberate, human-directed process of training an animal against its initially wild or natural instincts to avoid or attack humans. The tameability of an animal is the level of ease it takes humans to train the animal, and varies among individual animals, breeds, or species.

In other languages, the word for taming is the same as the word for domestication. However, in the English language, the two words refer to two partially overlapping but distinct concepts. For example feral animals are domesticated, but not tamed. Similarly, taming is not the same as animal training, although in some contexts these terms may be used interchangeably.

Taming implies that the animal tolerates not merely human proximity, but at minimum human touching. Yet, more common usage limits the label "tame" to animals which do not threaten or injure humans who do not harm or threaten them. Tameness, in this sense, should be distinguished from "socialization" wherein the animals treat humans much like conspecifics, for instance by trying to dominate humans.

Taming versus domestication
Domestication and taming are related but distinct concepts. Taming is the conditioned behavioral modification of a wild-born animal when its natural avoidance of humans is reduced and it accepts the presence of humans, but domestication is the permanent genetic modification of a bred lineage that leads to an inherited predisposition toward humans. Human selection included tameness, but domestication is not achieved without a suitable evolutionary response.

Domestic animals need not be tame in the behavioral sense, such as the Spanish fighting bull. Wild animals can be tame, such as a hand-raised cheetah. A domestic animal's breeding is controlled by humans and its tameness and tolerance of humans is genetically determined. Thus, an animal bred in captivity is not necessarily domesticated; tigers, gorillas, and polar bears breed readily in captivity but are not domesticated. Asian elephants are wild animals that with taming manifest outward signs of domestication, yet their breeding is not human controlled and thus they are not true domesticates.

See also
 Dressage and reining for horses
 Lion taming
 Tame bear
 Tame elephant
 Animals in professional wrestling

References

Sources

Stringham, S. F. 2010. When Bears Whisper, Do You Listen?  WildWatch,  Soldotna, AK.

Animals and humans